Camden Park is the name of several different locations:

Australia 

Camden Park, New South Wales, Australia, an outer suburb of Sydney, near Camden
Camden Park Estate, New South Wales, Australia, a property owned by John Macarthur, near Camden
Camden Park, South Australia, a suburb of Adelaide

United Kingdom 

 Camden Park, London, England

United States
Camden Park (amusement park) an amusement park near Huntington, West Virginia
Camden State Park, Minnesota
Oriole Park at Camden Yards, a baseball stadium located in Baltimore, Maryland